SLIAC could refer to either of the following:
The acronym for the St. Louis Intercollegiate Athletic Conference
A Slovak town, Sliač.